Acrotaeniostola quadrifasciata is a species of tephritid or fruit flies in the genus Acrotaeniostola of the family Tephritidae.

Distribution
Thailand, Laos, Vietnam, Malaysia, Indonesia.

References

Tephritinae
Insects described in 1911
Diptera of Asia